The statue of Charles IV is an outdoor sculpture of Charles IV, Holy Roman Emperor, located at Křižovnické Square in Prague, Czech Republic.

External links

 

Charles IV, Holy Roman Emperor
Monuments and memorials in Prague
Old Town (Prague)
Outdoor sculptures in Prague
Sculptures of men in Prague
Statues in Prague
Charles IV